Edwin Baker may refer to:

 Edwin Baker (CNIB) (1893–1968), Canadian co-founder of the Canadian National Institute for the Blind
 Edwin Baker (American football) (born 1991), American football running back
 Edwin T. Baker (1873–1936), member of the California Legislature
 Edwin Percy Baker (1895–1990), English lawn bowler

See also 
 Edward Baker (disambiguation)